Voir was a francophone alternative weekly newspaper in Montreal, Quebec, published by Communications Voir. Voir was founded by Pierre Paquet in November 1986. The first issue of the newspaper was published on 27 November 1986. Later on the newspaper developed various local issues with more targeted content.

In 2013, the newspaper dropped from weekly to biweekly publication.

On April 29, 2015, it was announced that all shares owned by Paquet were purchased by a group of buyers composed of XPND Capital, a Quebec-based private equity firm, and two members of Voir'''s  management team, Michel Fortin and Hugues Mailhot.

Starting 2016, it commenced publishing as a free monthly magazine. In February 2019, the owners Mishmash Média announced that it was discontinuing the monthly paper edition to concentrate on the digital online edition. The paper format however may be used occasionally and very selectively on certain special issues and supplements of the publication.

Chain
The newspaper also formerly published local editions in Quebec City, Saguenay/Alma, Estrie, Mauricie and Gatineau/Ottawa. They published a mix of locally oriented news and advertisement and listings, as well as chainwide common content published by all the editions.

Communications Voir ceased publication of these regional editions in 2012 and 2013,"Voir Gatineau-Ottawa disparaît". Le Droit, April 13, 2013. retaining regionally focused content only on the publication's website

Supplements and special sectionsVoir carried since 2003 a weekly lifestyle supplement Voir la Vie / Voir la Ville containing amongst other restaurant reviews, travel and real estate / decoration.
It also carried a special musical section entitled Bang Bang (earlier a separate periodical paper) but now incorporated within Voir.Voir also had a graphic design / typography supplement, but that section was discontinued later.

Other publications
Communications Voir, the paper's publisher, also published the now-defunct anglophone alternative weeklies Hour in Montreal and XPress'' in Ottawa, Ontario. Both have been discontinued.

See also
List of newspapers in Canada

References

External links
 Voir Official website
 BangBang music blog
 Guide Restos (GR), part of Voir la Vie supplement

Newspapers established in 1986
Newspapers published in Quebec City
Newspapers published in Montreal
Newspapers published in Sherbrooke
French-language newspapers published in Quebec
Alternative weekly newspapers published in Canada
Mass media in Saguenay, Quebec
Mass media in Trois-Rivières
Mass media in Ottawa–Gatineau
Weekly newspapers published in Quebec
1986 establishments in Quebec